Río Grande is a town and municipality of Puerto Rico located on the eastern edge of the Northern Coastal Valley, north of Las Piedras, Naguabo and Ceiba; east of Loíza and Canóvanas and west of Luquillo. Río Grande is spread over eight barrios and Río Grande Pueblo (the downtown area and the administrative center of the city). It is part of the San Juan-Caguas-Guaynabo Metropolitan Statistical Area. A big portion of El Yunque National Forest, including El Yunque's peak, is located within the municipality.

History
Río Grande was founded on July 16, 1840, by Desiderio and Quilimaco Escobar, with the approval of Governor Miguel López. It was named after the Río Grande and is located where the Río Grande and the Río Espíritu Santo join.

In 1894, there were two sugar cane haciendas and 256 estancias growing minor fruits.

Hurricane Maria on September 20, 2017, triggered numerous landslides in Río Grande with the significant amount of rainfall. Infrastructure was destroyed, trees were ripped out of the ground, and rivers were breached causing property losses to approximately 5000 people. Of the Puerto Rican amazon, 230 in captivity did survive.

Geography 
Río Grande is on the northeastern coast of the island north of the Sierra de Luquillo. A large portion of El Yunque National Forest and some of the highest points of the Sierra de Luquillo are located within Río Grande including El Yunque and El Toro, which at 3,474 feet (1,070 m) is the highest point in eastern Puerto Rico.

Barrios

Like all municipalities of Puerto Rico, Río Grande is subdivided into barrios (which mean barrios or boroughs or neighborhoods in Spanish). The municipal buildings, central square and a large Catholic church are located in a small, central barrio called barrio-pueblo or simply .

Ciénaga Alta 
Ciénaga Baja 
Guzmán Abajo 
Guzmán Arriba 
Herreras 
Jiménez 
Mameyes II 
Río Grande barrio-pueblo
Zarzal

Sectors

Barrios (which are like minor civil divisions) in turn are further subdivided into smaller local populated place areas/units called sectores (which means sectors in English). The types of sectores may vary, from normally sector to urbanización to reparto to barriada to residencial, among others.

Special Communities

 (Special Communities of Puerto Rico) are marginalized communities whose citizens are experiencing a certain amount of social exclusion. A map shows these communities occur in nearly every municipality of the commonwealth. Of the 742 places that were on the list in 2014, the following barrios, communities, sectors, or neighborhoods were in Río Grande: Sector Montebello and Sector El Hoyo in Malpica, Las Dolores, La Ponderosa, Villa Realidad, Estancias del Sol, and Hong Kong.

Demographics
In 1894, while a Spanish colony, the population of Río Grande was 6,237. Puerto Rico was ceded by Spain in the aftermath of the Spanish–American War under the terms of the Treaty of Paris of 1898 and became a territory of the United States. In 1899, the United States conducted its first census of Puerto Rico finding that the population of Río Grande was 12,365.

Tourism
Río Grande is home to one of the largest secluded areas with beach access (Coco Beach) on the entire island. Major hotels in the area include Wyndham Grand Rio Mar Resort and Hyatt Regency Grand Reserve. Every March, Hyatt Regency Grand Reserve plays host to the PGA Tour's Puerto Rico Open.

Within a ten-minute drive is El Yunque National Forest, the only tropical rain forest within the United States National Forest System.

Hotels
The Wyndham Grand Rio Mar Beach Resort and Spa
Hyatt Regency Grand Reserve 
St. Regis Bahía Beach Resort & Golf Club

Landmarks and places of interest
There are 27 beaches in Río Grande.
Main attractions of Río Grande are:
Coco Beach
El Yunque
Indio Cave
Las Picúas Beach

Economy

Agriculture
The municipality has agricultural activity that produces fruits, vegetables, ornamental plants, and cattle.

Business
Local retail stores are aside highway PR-3. There is one large shopping mall located on 65th Infantry expressway and 956th street. The northeastern area of Puerto Rico has attracted hotels, shopping malls, sport venues among others. In 2012 the Puerto Rico Highway 66, which provides easy access to San Juan, was opened which runs along the municipality.

In 2019, volunteers and police who formed a group called  celebrated their 32nd year aiding local businesses with security issues. This group works to ensure the safety and security of business patrons in the downtown area of Río Piedras.

Culture

Festivals and events
Río Grande celebrates its patron saint festival in July. The  is a religious and cultural celebration that generally features parades, games, artisans, amusement rides, regional food, and live entertainment.

Other festivals and events celebrated in Río Grande include:
Río Grande Carnival – July
Stuffed Potato Festival – April
Las Picúas Festival – September

Sports
Baseball, basketball and handball are popular sports in Río Grande.

Government

Like all municipalities in Puerto Rico, Río Grande is administered by a mayor. The current mayor is Angel "Bori" González, who was elected in a special election on September 14, 2014. González is replacing Eduard Rivera Correa, who was elected at the 2004 general election. However, Rivera Correa stepped down from office after being indicted on federal charges.

The city belongs to the Puerto Rico Senatorial district VIII, which is represented by two senators. In 2012, Pedro A. Rodríguez and Luis Daniel Rivera were elected as District Senators.

Transportation
There are 48 bridges in Río Grande.

Symbols

The  has an official flag and coat of arms.

Flag
The Río Grande flag consists of two horizontal stripes of equal size, upper one is green with lower one been blue, and united by a white triangle placed on the side of the mast. On the white triangle is a Puerto Rican parrot.

Coat of arms
In a silver field, two Puerto Rican parrot (Amazona vitatta), accompanied by a waving blue stripe, a green mountain with three peaks. The top portion of the shield is blue, with an opened silver book, accompanied on each side by five gold coins. Topped by a three tower gold crown outlined in black with green openings.

Gallery
Sites around Río Grande:

See also

List of Puerto Ricans
History of Puerto Rico
Did you know-Puerto Rico?

References

Further reading

External links 
 Río Grande and its barrios, United States Census Bureau
 Puerto Rico Government Directory - Rio Grande

 
Municipalities of Puerto Rico
Populated coastal places in Puerto Rico
Populated places established in 1840
San Juan–Caguas–Guaynabo metropolitan area